FC UAS Zhitkovichi is a Belarusian football club based in Zhitkovichi, Gomel Oblast. The team plays in the Belarusian First League.

History
The club was founded in 2014 as UA-Stroy-Zhitkovichi and joined the Belarusian Second League the same year. In 2015, they played as UAS-DYuSSh Zhitkovichi and in 2016 they settled with the current version of the name (UAS Zhitkovichi). UAS Zhitkovichi won the Second League in 2017 and will make their First League debut in 2018.

References

External links
Profile at footballfacts.ru

Defunct football clubs in Belarus
2014 establishments in Belarus
2019 disestablishments in Belarus
Association football clubs established in 2014
Association football clubs disestablished in 2019